William Erwin Paul (June 12, 1936 – September 18, 2015) was an American immunologist. He and Maureen Howard discovered interleukin 4, while an independent team led by Ellen Vitetta did the same in 1982. Paul worked on AIDS research for much of his career at the National Institutes of Health (NIH). He served as president of the American Association of Immunologists from 1986 to 1987.

Background
Paul's father Jack immigrated to the United States from Ukraine with his mother and younger siblings in 1911 to join his father and other family members. While in America, Jack Paul met and married Sylvia Gleicher, a cousin of Norman Geschwind. Their son William Erwin Paul was born in Brooklyn, New York on June 12, 1936. William Paul attended Erasmus Hall High School and graduated from Andrew Jackson High School, Queens, New York. William Paul graduated from Brooklyn College in 1956 before earning a medical degree from SUNY Downstate College of Medicine four years later.

Career
Paul did his residency at the Boston Medical Center and National Cancer Institute (NCI). He joined the United States Public Health Service Commissioned Corps in 1962 and was assigned to the Endocrinology Branch of the NCI, where he worked for two years. Paul read the writings of Michael Heidelberger, and decided to train as an immunologist. A desire to collaborate with rheumatologist Alan Cohen influenced his decision as well. Paul trained at New York University with Baruj Benacerraf and later moved with him to the National Institute of Allergy and Infectious Diseases (NIAID). He succeeded Benacerraf as NIH immunology laboratory director in 1970. Upon the establishment of NIH's Office of AIDS Research in 1993, Paul was chosen as its first leader. He stepped down from that position in 1997. He also helped found NIAID's Vaccine Research Center. Paul was the founding editor of the Annual Review of Immunology from 1983 to 2011. He received the 2002 American Association of Immunologists Lifetime Achievement Award and the 2008 Max Delbrück Medal.

Paul was adjunct professor at the University of Pennsylvania School of Medicine and the Raymond and Beverly Sackler Senior Professor at Tel Aviv University.

He died in Manhattan of acute myeloid leukemia on September 18, 2015, aged 79.

References

External links

1936 births
2015 deaths
American immunologists
SUNY Downstate Medical Center alumni
Brooklyn College alumni
Erasmus Hall High School alumni
People from Brooklyn
Deaths from cancer in New York (state)
Deaths from leukemia
American people of Ukrainian-Jewish descent
United States Public Health Service Commissioned Corps admirals
United States Public Health Service Commissioned Corps officers
United States Public Health Service personnel
HIV/AIDS researchers
National Institutes of Health people
Members of the United States National Academy of Sciences
Fellows of the American Academy of Arts and Sciences
University of Pennsylvania faculty
Academic staff of Tel Aviv University
Scientists from New York (state)
Annual Reviews (publisher) editors
Members of the National Academy of Medicine